Cub Scouts, Cubs or Wolf Cubs are programs associated with Scouting for young children usually between 7 and 12, depending on the organization to which they belong. A participant in the program is called a Cub. A group of Cubs is called a 'Pack'.

The Wolf Cub program was originated by The Boy Scouts Association in the United Kingdom in 1916 to provide a program for boys who were too young to be Boy Scouts. It was adopted by many other Scouting organizations. Many Scouting organizations, including The Scout Association, no longer use the Wolf Cub program and have replaced it with other programs but have retained the name Cubs. Others, including Traditional Scouting organizations, maintain the original Wolf Cubs program.

Originally Cubs programs were open only to boys, while young girls could join the Brownies. Some Cub organizations are open to both girls and boys, although not necessarily in the same unit. A few organizations also operate a Sea Cub version of Cubs.

Foundation

The Wolf Cub scheme was started by The Boy Scouts Association in 1916, nine years after the idea of the Boy Scouts was conceived, in order to cater to the many younger boys who were too young to be Boy Scouts. During these first years many troops had either allowed younger boys to join or had set up unofficial junior or cadet Scout troops. In 1916, articles in the Headquarters Gazette (a then regular journal for leaders) outlined official "Junior Scout" then "Wolf Cub" schemes. However, Robert Baden-Powell wanted something quite different from a watered down Boy Scout program and recognized that too close of an association between the junior program and the Boy Scouts would detract from both. Baden-Powell wanted a junior scheme with distinct name, uniform and other identity and program.

In 1916, Baden-Powell published his own outlines for such a scheme, it was to be called Wolf Cubs. Baden-Powell asked his friend Rudyard Kipling for the use of his Jungle Book history and universe as a motivational frame for the Wolf Cub scheme. The scheme was given a publicity launch at The Boy Scouts Association's Imperial Headquarters in Buckingham Palace Road, Westminster, on Saturday 24 June 1916.  Baden-Powell wrote a new book, The Wolf Cub's Handbook, the first edition of which was published in December 1916. He collaborated with Vera Barclay in devising the Wolf Cub training programme and badges, which were published in the second edition. On 16 December 1916, a public display of the new section was held at Caxton Hall, Westminster, to which Kipling was invited; he was unable to attend but sent Baden-Powell a letter of apology, praising his work with the Scout Movement. Vera Barclay co founded Wolf Cubs with Baden -Powell in 1916 .

From the 1960s, many organizations varied or abandoned the Wolf Cub Jungle Book theme. Some organizations changed the name to Cubs, Cub Scouts or something similar but retained the Jungle Stories and Cub ceremony as tradition—such as the use of Jungle Book names (as described below); and the Grand Howl which signals the start and end of Cub Meetings. Other organizations kept the name but dropped the Jungle Book theme totally.

Originally, Cub membership was open only to boys while the Brownies were set up as a parallel section for young girls. This remains the situation in some places.  Most member organizations of the World Organization of the Scout Movement (WOSM) admitted girls to Cubs while others have separate co-ed sections with a different theme. Most member organizations of the Union Internationale des Guides et Scouts d'Europe (UIGSE) have two single sex sections both named Wolf Cubs and both in the jungle theme.

Cub Scouting has ideals of spiritual and character growth, citizenship training, and personal fitness.  Cub Scouting provides a positive, encouraging peer group, carefully selected leaders  who provide good role models and a group setting where values are taught to reinforce positive qualities of character.

Organization
Cubs are organized in packs, which are sometimes linked to a Scout group, providing a community with all age sections known as a "Scouting family".  Adult leaders of Cub packs take the names of The Jungle Books main characters.  In many countries the leader of the Pack is called Akela; subordinate leaders are named Bagheera, Baloo, Rikki-Tikki-Tavi, etc., in order by how many sub-leaders the pack has. A few very big packs need so many sub-leaders that their names must extend to include Tabaqui and Shere Khan, but that tends be the cue for the pack to split into two packs. Cubs have a distinctive two-finger salute according to the Jungle theme, in contrast to the three-finger salute of Boy Scouts. However, in The Scout Association of United Kingdom (UK) and some of its overseas branches the two-finger salute was later replaced by the three-finger salute. Historically, Cubs wear a distinctive headdress, which is a tight-fitting green felt cap with green felt visor, yellow pipings, and an emblem at the front — although in some countries this has been replaced by more contemporary headgear or dispensed with entirely.

Just as Scout troops are subdivided into patrols, Cub packs are divided into small teams.  Baden-Powell named the team a Six, which refers to the six members in each team.  In most countries Sixes are mixed-age groups with the oldest as sixer ("leader"). In the Boy Scouts of America (BSA), the teams are called dens, with each den serving either boys or girls in the same school grade.

Youth leaders from more senior sections of Scouting are actively encouraged to assist as Cub leaders.  In the UK and in Australia these were originally called Cub Instructors.  Within Scouts Australia the term Youth Helper is now formally applied to such persons, whilst in the United Kingdom they are called Young Leaders. In Canada, a Scout who assists in the Cub program is designated as a Kim.  In the United States, the term Den Chief is used.

In many European countries (especially where the Jungle theme still has a strong part in the programme), St. Francis of Assisi is the patron saint of Cubs, because of his relationship with wolves.

Cubs in national organizations

Australia

Baden-Powell Scouts' Association
The Baden-Powell Scouts' Association in Australia operate a 'Wolf Cub' section between its Koalas program and Boy Scout.  Wolf Cub packs are themed on "The Jungle Book" by Rudyard Kipling, a friend of Baden-Powell. Wolf Cub packs are divided into Sixes, with each six being identified by a coloured triangular patch on the member's arm.  Each Six is led by a 'Sixer' and a 'Seconder', who have their rank indicated by horizontal yellow stripes sewn onto their left arm.

Scouts Australia
In Scouts Australia, the Cub Scout program is open to all children (girls and boys) ages 8–11. The uniform is a navy-blue, button-up or polo-style, short sleeved shirt with a yellow collar, sleeves and shoulders. Patrols are identified by a coloured band/ring (red, yellow, green, orange, blue, black, white, grey, tan, purple) worn round their scarf, above their woggle. Patrol Leaders wear a second band/ring on the other side of their scarf which is white with two blue stripes. They are supported by their Assistant Patrol Leader, who will step into the leadership role if the Patrol Leader is away, and will help at Unit Councils. They wear a white band/ring with one blue stripe.

Together, the Patrol Leaders and Assistant Patrol Leaders from every patrol make up the Unit Council. They take a leading role in planning and running activities.

Austria
In Pfadfinder und Pfadfinderinnen Österreichs Cub Scouting is the section for children in the age of 7 to 10. The jungle theme is the symbolic framework. The first pack was started in autumn of 1920 in Vienna. At the beginning there were different symbolic frameworks: red Indians (taken from "Kibbo Kift" written by John Hargrave) and Robinson Crusoe. In the 1930s the Jungle theme was introduced.

Canada
In 1916, the Cub Scout program was introduced as part of Scouts Canada with a programme similar to that of the UK. Cub Scouting is open to youth of both sexes, ages 8 to 10 inclusive. Sixes wear a coloured triangular patch, rather than a distinctive woggle. (If brown, for example, the six is known as Brown Six.) The Cub motto is "Do Your Best" and the promise, the vow recited in opening ceremonies is: 
"I promise to do my best, 
to do my duty to God and the Queen, 
to keep the law of the Wolfcub pack, 
and do a good turn every day."

Hong Kong
The tradition of Cub Scouting in Hong Kong was inherited from the British.  It is the largest section of the Scout Movement in Hong Kong. A Pack is headed by a Cub Scout Leader (團長), with several Assistant Cub Scout Leaders (副團長) and Instructors (教練員). The division within a Pack is called a Six (小隊).  Each Six has a Sixer (隊長) and a Seconder (隊副 or 副隊長).  Each Six is distinguished by a colour and is named after it.  Each member of the Six wears a woggle with the colour of his Six. The Promise and Law for the Cub Scouts are simplified from those for Scouts. Traditionally, the logo of the Wolf Cub denotes the Cub Scouts, but it is rarely used.

Ireland

In Ireland, the section is known as both Cub Scouts and Macaoimh, depending on the tradition from which the particular Scout troop comes.

Netherlands

The jungle theme is the symbolic framework of the Welpen (Cubs). Welpen wear green uniforms. Among a horde ("pack") of Cub Scouts, the cubs are divided into nesten ("nests"). Each nest has a Gids (Guide) and a Helper. Like all sections Welpen is open to both boys and girls, but Scout Groups can have single-sex sections. Starting 2010 the symbolic framework of the Welpen will be based on a modified version of the Jungle Book with two main characters: the boy Mowgli and the girl Shanti. The new Welpen section will gradually replace the four sections in the age group Scouting Nederland had before: Welpen, Kabouters (Brownies), Dolfijnen ("Dolphins") and Esta's. Dolfijnen has a water based symbolic framework, Esta's has a special developed co-ed symbolic framework. The new Welpen contains elements from all four previous sections.

New Zealand

In New Zealand, the Cubs section is known as Cub Scouts, and largely follows the format of the United Kingdom, though it is administered under the main Scouts New Zealand association. The Cub section is for children aged 8 to 11 years. They meet weekly at their Scout Hall and take part in all sorts of activities. There are approximately 410 scout groups in New Zealand, all of which have a cub section, typically along with other sections for younger kids (Keas) and older members (Scouts, Venturers and Rovers) .Scouts New Zealand Sections.

Poland

In the Polish Scouting and Guiding Association, Cub Scouts and Brownies's section is called "zuchy" and is open to children ages 6–10. Members are organized into cub packs where they learn to integrate into a collective of friends. Any kind of learning is accomplished by playing games. They can earn three Cub Scout Stars "Gwiazdki zuchowe" and a lot of individual and group merit badges.

Singapore
In Singapore, the junior section of the Scouting movement was known as the Cadet Scouts, until 2005 when it was renamed to Cub Scouts in line with international practice.

Cub Scout 's age group is from 7–12, following the Jungle Book Theme . Each Cub Scout Pack is led by Cub Scout Leader assisted by Asst. Cub Scout Leaders. Pack are sub divided to small group in six cubs called Six. Within the Six, is led by Sixer and Asst. Sixer. Cub Scout Pack in Singapore, majority are in School and the teachers are the Cub Scout Leader and Asst. Cub Scout Leaders, some parent are also involved and actively served as Volunteer Adult Leaders (VAL).

Highest Award for the Cub Scout is Akela Award. It is awarded to the cub scouts who completed the badge scheme and assessments criteria.

United Kingdom

Baden-Powell Scouts' Association

The Baden-Powell Scouts' Association operate a 'Wolf Cub' section between Beavers and Scouts.  Wolf Cub packs are themed on "The Jungle Book" by Rudyard Kipling, a friend of Baden-Powell. Wolf Cub packs are divided into Sixes, with each six being identified by a coloured triangular patch on the member's arm.  Each Six is led by a 'Sixer' and a 'Seconder', who have their rank indicated by horizontal yellow stripes sewn onto their left arm.

British Boy Scouts
The British Boy Scouts and British Girl Scouts Association allow use of the Wolf Cubs program as an alternative to its Junior Scout section.

The Scout Association

In the Scout Association, Sixes are led by a 'Sixer' and have a 'Seconder' (or 'Second') as a backup. The Sixer wears two stripes on his/her uniform and the Seconder one stripe. When a Cub Scout is made a Sixer, the Second's badge (with one stripe) should be removed and replaced with the Sixer's badge. The members of a six are distinguished by the colour of the woggle they wear on their Group neckerchief (known elsewhere as a Group scarf).

The three points of the fleur-de-lys, Scout salute and Scout sign remind the cub scout of the three points of the Cub Scout's Promise: "Duty to God and King, Helpfulness to other people, and Obedience to the Cub Scout Law."

United States

Boy Scouts of America

Cub Scouting is a division of the Boy Scouts of America (BSA).  Starting in 1918, a number of experiments operated until 1930, when the first official Cub Scout packs were registered. Today, it is a family program for children in kindergarten through fifth grade, with each den admitting boys or girls only. Parents, leaders, and organizations work together to achieve the purposes of Cub Scouting. Families are a core part of Cub Scouts and are included in many activities. Currently, Cub Scouting is the largest of the BSA's three membership divisions.

Baden-Powell Service Association
In the Baden-Powell Service Association, the corresponding section for this age group is called Timberwolves.  As with the Scout Association, each pack is divided into Sixes led by a 'Sixer' with a 'Seconder' assisting.  The Pack  retains Baden-Powell's original Jungle Book theme, with its leader called Akela and assistant leaders using names like Raksha, Bagheera, or Baloo.

See also

References

Scouting